The Piedmontese regional election of 1975 took place on 15 June 1975. Ten new seats were added to the Regional Council following the 1971 census.

Events
Christian Democracy resulted narrowly behind the Italian Communist Party, which was the real winner of the election.

After the election, the Italian Socialist Party, which had been a junior partner in the Christian Democrat-led regional government since 1970, switched sides and formed a coalition with the Communists (Frontism). The new regional government, composed of Communists and Socialists, was led by Socialist Aldo Viglione. Piedmont was thus the first and only Region of the North, along with neighbouring Liguria, to have a left-wing government.

Results

Source: Ministry of the Interior

Elections in Piedmont
1975 elections in Italy